The 2018 USL season was the eighth season of the United Soccer League and second under Division II sanctioning. The previous season, the USL had provisional Div. II sanctioning from the United States Soccer Federation (U.S. Soccer) along with the North American Soccer League, but was given full sanctioning for the 2018 season with a two-year deadline to meet the full requirements set by U.S. Soccer.

Louisville City FC were the defending USL Cup champions, while Real Monarchs were the defending Supporters’ Shield champions.

This season was the last for four teams in the USL, with all changing leagues for 2019 and beyond. FC Cincinnati will join Major League Soccer. MLS side Toronto FC announced that its reserve side, Toronto FC II, would drop to USL League One, a third-level league slated to launch in 2019, and the Richmond Kickers also chose to drop to League One for 2019 and beyond. Near the end of the season, Penn FC announced that it would suspend professional operations for 2019 and resume play in League One in 2020.

It was also the final season for the league under the "United Soccer League" name. Effective with the 2019 season, the league has been rebranded as the USL Championship.

Changes from 2017
Expansion
Atlanta United 2
Fresno FC
Las Vegas Lights FC
Nashville SC

Joined from NASL
Indy Eleven
North Carolina FC

On hiatus
Orlando City B
 During the 2018 season, City B's MLS parent, Orlando City SC, announced that City B would resume play in 2019 as a founding member of USL League One.
Rochester Rhinos
 During the 2018 season, the Rhinos announced they would not return to the USL's top flight. The team will not resume professional operations until the 2020 season, at which time it will join USL League One.

Folded
Vancouver Whitecaps 2

Rule changes
Regular season games will now be considered official after the 70th minute. Teams are allowed a fourth substitution in extra time for the USL Playoffs. Teams will submit a 23-player squad at least 48 hours before kickoff. A team's 18-player gameday roster may now contain a maximum of five players signed to USL Academy contracts.

Teams

Other venues
Four Toronto FC II home games were played at Marina Auto Stadium in Rochester, New York.
Nashville's March 24 game against Pittsburgh, and the July 7 game against FC Cincinnati, were played at Nissan Stadium.
Toronto's May 9 game against Penn FC was moved to Monarch Park Stadium due to BMO Field needing time to recover due to a busy early schedule.
The conclusion of a suspended game from June 16 between Atlanta United 2 and Ottawa was played August 7 at Fifth Third Bank Stadium in Kennesaw, Georgia.

Competition format
The season began on March 16 and ends on October 14. The top eight finishers in each conference qualify for the playoffs.

Managerial changes

‡ Luke Spencer, Paolo DelPiccolo, & George Davis IV appointed joint interim head coaches.

League table
Eastern Conference 

Western Conference

Results table

Playoffs

Eastern Conference

Western Conference

USL Championship

Championship Game MVP: Luke Spencer (LOU)

Attendance

Average home attendances
Ranked from highest to lowest average attendance.

† Two Toronto FC II home matches were moved to Highmark Stadium and Sportsplex at Matthews due to unplayable field conditions.

Updated to games of October 14, 2018.
Sources: USL Soccer Stadium Digest

Statistical leaders

Top scorers 

Source:

Top assists 

Source:

Shutouts

Source:

Hat-tricks

League awards

Individual awards 
 Most Valuable Player:  Emmanuel Ledesma (CIN) 
 Defender of the Year:  Forrest Lasso  (CIN) 
 Young Player of the Year:  Efrain Alvarez (LAG) 
 Goalkeeper of the Year:  Maxime Crépeau (OTT) 
 Coach of the Year:  Alan Koch (CIN) 
 Golden Boot:  Cameron Lancaster (LOU)
 Assists Champion:  Emmanuel Ledesma (CIN)
 Golden Glove:  Evan Newton (CIN)

All-League teams 
First Team

F: Thomas Enevoldsen (OCO), Cameron Lancaster (LOU), Daniel Rios (NCA)
M: Tah Anunga (CHS), Solomon Asante (PHX), Emmanuel Ledesma (CIN), Aodhan Quinn (OCO)
D: Paco Craig (LOU), Joe Greenspan (PIT), Forrest Lasso (CIN)
G: Maxime Crépeau (OTT)

Second Team

F: Hadji Barry (SPR), Ataulla Guerra (CHS), Cameron Iwasa (SAC)
M: Kyle Bekker (NCA), Corben Bone (CIN), Kenardo Forbes (PIT), Lebo Moloto (NSH)
D: Ayoze (IND), Darnell King (SAN), Denso Ulysse (SEA)
G: Josh Cohen (SAC)

References

	

 
USL Championship seasons
2018 in American soccer leagues